The Lesser Sundas goshawk (Accipiter hiogaster sylvestris) is a bird of prey native to Indonesia. It is sometimes elevated to species status, but the IOC lumps it together with the variable goshawk (A. hiogaster).

References

Lesser Sundas goshawk
Birds of the Lesser Sunda Islands
Lesser Sundas goshawk